"My Bad Too" is the seventh episode of season seven and the 146th episode of the American sitcom Scrubs. It aired on April 10, 2008 on NBC, as the first episode to air after the 2007–2008 Writers Guild of America strike.

Plot
As the sixth anniversary of Turk and Carla's first date approaches, Turk, in order to surprise Carla with a thoughtful gift, has been learning Spanish for the past few months. Meanwhile, one of J.D.'s patients, Emory, pleads to attend his graduation though he is in severe burn treatment. Unable to make a decision, J.D. seeks advice from Elliot; she agrees that Emory has treatable burns but that she wouldn't get his hopes up, but J.D. ignores her and gladly tells Emory he can attend his graduation. Later on, however, Dr. Cox reveals that the Emory's leg has become infected and that there is no way he is going to his graduation. Later on that day while Carla is on the phone, Turk is bugging her about "brinner" (breakfast for dinner), she comments on the idea by saying, in Spanish, that she would cook breakfast for dinner every day if he would clean the house. Turk, upon hearing that, quickly cleans the apartment, which Carla sees as a coincidence, and rewards him with flapjacks for dinner. Turk realizes that understanding Spanish without Carla knowing could actually be an advantage, and so decides not to tell her. To deal with the guilt of lying to his wife, he tells her she can pick out anything she wants from the jewelry store.

Dr. Cox and Dr. Kelso tell Turk that he has a massive advantage over other married men: he can 'spy' on Carla without her knowing. However, Dr. Cox eventually sells him out and says to Carla in Spanish, "Your husband thinks you're an overbearing control freak with Izzy", which Turk then denies, revealing his secret. Carla is upset at first, but at the end of the episode realizes that Turk was trying to do a nice thing, and that now they can talk privately to each other when J.D. and Elliot are around. They end up commenting in Spanish that Elliot and J.D. will probably be back together in five weeks, as the pair appear to be getting closer than they have been in years. Elsewhere, Dr. Cox decides to get on Dr. Kelso's nerves by messing around with his food.

Reception

"My Bad Too" received a 4.1 Nielsen rating and a six percent ratings share. The episode was watched by 6.57 million viewers and achieved a 3.4/8 in the key adults 18–49 demographic.

The episode received a 9.5 on IGN.com.

References

External links
 

Scrubs (season 7) episodes
2008 American television episodes